Figueira is a settlement in the southern part of the island of Maio. It consists of the villages Figueira da Horta and Figueira Seca. Figueira is 7 km east of the island capital Porto Inglês. As of the 2010 census, its population was 529. It sits at 40 meters above sea level.

See also
List of villages and settlements in Cape Verde

References
 

Villages and settlements in Maio, Cape Verde